The FIL European Luge Championships 2008 took place January 7-13, 2008 at the Cesana Pariol track in Cesana, Italy. The relay competition took the place of the team event that had been held at every European championship since 1988. This event had all teams start at the same part of the track (located at the women's singles/ men's doubles start house), then run down to the finish and tap on a relay marker to exchange from one slider on a team to the next (men's doubles to women's singles to men's singles) with the fastest time winning.

Time table
Practice dates for the events took place January 7-11 with event draws taking place on the 11th.
Opening ceremonies took place at 6 PM CET (17:00 UTC) on January 10.
To avoid direct sunlight, the events were conducted in the early morning both days.

Competitors
80 competitors from 15 nations competed at these championships. This included ten relay teams which took place on the 13th.

Men's singles
January 13, 2008 at 8 AM CET (07:00 UTC)

This was Zöggeler's second European championship in this event and fifth straight medal at the championships.

Women's singles
January 12, 2008 at 9 AM CET (08:00 UTC)

Geisenberger won her first ever championship. The event was delayed one hour to heavy snowfall in the area. Hadler is the first non-German to medal in this event at the Winter Olympic, world, or European level since fellow Austrian Angelika Neuner won a bronze at the 1998 Winter Olympics.

Men's doubles
January 12, 2008 at 3 PM CET (14:00 UTC)

The tie for the bronze was the first in a Winter Olympic, world championship, or European championship event since they started timing luge in the 1/1000ths of a second following the tie between Italy and East Germany in the men's doubles event at the 1972 Winter Olympics in Sapporo. Oberstolz and Gruber won their first ever title, ending Leitner and Resch's four-time championships reign in this event.

Mixed team relay
January 13, 2008 at 12 PM CET (11:00 UTC)

For the first time since the event debuted at the 1988 championships, Germany did not medal, finishing fourth.

Medal table

References
Latvia wins mixed team relay.
Zöggeler win men's singles event
Oberstolz and Gruber wins men's doubles event
Geisenberger wins women's singles European championships
FIL-Luge news on snowfall delaying the women's singles event.
FIL European Luge Championships 2008 preview - Accessed January 8, 2008.
FIL European Luge Championships 2008 detailed schedule released - Accessed January 10, 2008.
FIL European Luge Championships 2008 program  - Accessed January 7, 2008.
FIL awards FIL World Luge Championships 2011 to Cesana, Italy (lists 2008 European championships that the venue will also host).
FIL artificial track schedule for 2007-08, including the European championships at Cesana.
Men's doubles European champions
Men's singles European champions
Mixed teams European champions
Women's singles European champions

FIL European Luge Championships
2008 in luge
Luge in Italy
2008 in Italian sport